The Competition for Authenticated Encryption: Security, Applicability, and Robustness (CAESAR) is a competition organized by a group of international cryptologic researchers to encourage the design of authenticated encryption schemes. The competition was announced at the Early Symmetric Crypto workshop in January 2013 and the final portfolio in February 2019.

Use Cases 
The final CAESAR portfolio is organized into three use cases:

 1: Lightweight applications (resource constrained environments)
 2: High-performance applications
 3: Defense in depth

Final Portfolio 
The final portfolio announced by the CAESAR committee is:

CAESAR committee 
The committee in charge of the CAESAR Competition consisted of:

 Steve Babbage (Vodafone Group, UK)
 Daniel J. Bernstein (University of Illinois at Chicago, USA, and Technische Universiteit Eindhoven, Netherlands); secretary, non-voting
 Alex Biryukov (University of Luxembourg, Luxembourg)
 Anne Canteaut (Inria Paris-Rocquencourt, France)
 Carlos Cid (Royal Holloway, University of London, UK)
 Joan Daemen (STMicroelectronics, Belgium)
 Orr Dunkelman (University of Haifa, Israel)
 Henri Gilbert (ANSSI, France)
 Tetsu Iwata (Nagoya University, Japan)
 Stefan Lucks (Bauhaus-Universität Weimar, Germany)
 Willi Meier (FHNW, Switzerland)
 Bart Preneel (COSIC, KU Leuven, Belgium)
 Vincent Rijmen (KU Leuven, Belgium)
 Matt Robshaw (Impinj, USA)
 Phillip Rogaway (University of California at Davis, USA)
 Greg Rose (kitchen4140, USA)
 Serge Vaudenay (EPFL, Switzerland)
 Hongjun Wu (Nanyang Technological University, Singapore)

References

External links 
 Homepage for the project

Symmetric-key cryptography
Cryptography contests
Research projects